Anastasiia Dmitrievna Guliakova (born 29 August 2002) is a Russian figure skater. She is the 2020 Rostelecom Cup bronze medalist, the 2018 Warsaw Cup champion, the 2019 Tallink Hotels Cup champion, and the 2018 Skate Victoria champion. Earlier in her career, she won silver at the 2017 JGP Australia.

Career

Early years 
Guliakova began learning to skate in 2005. She trained in Pervouralsk, Sverdlovsk Oblast, under Pyotr Kiprushev until 2015; she then moved to Moscow and began to be coached by Ilia Klimkin.

Guliakova finished eighth at the 2017 Russian Junior Championships behind Anastasiia Gubanova. In the summer of 2018, she parted ways with Klimkin to move to Alexei Mishin's camp.

2017–18 season 
Guliakova made her international debut in the first Junior Grand Prix event at the 2017 Junior Grand Prix Australia in Brisbane, Australia; she was ranked second in both segments and won the silver medal behind teammate Alexandra Trusova.

At the 2018 Russian Championships, Gulyakova placed thirteenth on the senior level and tenth at the junior event.

2018–19 season 
In late November Guliakova made her international senior debut at the 2018 Warsaw Cup where she won the gold medal. In early December she competed at the 2018 CS Golden Spin of Zagreb where she finished fourth with a personal best score of 188.90 points.

2019–20 season 
Competing internationally, Guliakova won silver medals at the Denis Ten Memorial Challenge and the Tallinn Trophy.  She placed seventh at the 2020 Russian Championships.

2020–21 season 
Competing domestically in the Russian Cup series, Guliakova placed fifth at the third stage in Sochi.  She was assigned to make her Grand Prix debut at the 2020 Rostelecom Cup, the ISU having opted to run the Grand Prix based largely on geographic location due to the COVID-19 pandemic.  She placed fourth in the short program.  Third in the free skate, she rose to the bronze medal position following an unexpectedly poor performance from Alexandra Trusova, who dropped to fourth place.

On December 3, it was announced that Guliakova had to withdraw from the fifth stage of the Cup of Russia series after training mate Elizaveta Tuktamysheva contracted COVID-19.  She subsequently competed at the 2021 Russian Championships, placing eighth in the short program after stepping out on her triple Lutz.  She then placed fourteenth in the free skate, dropping to twelfth overall.

Programs

Competitive highlights 
JGP: Junior Grand Prix

Detailed results

Senior level

Junior level

References

External links 
 
 

2002 births
Russian female single skaters
Living people
People from Revda, Sverdlovsk Oblast
Sportspeople from Sverdlovsk Oblast